Los Polvorines is a district (localidad) in the urban conurbation of Greater Buenos Aires, Argentina. It is the county seat of Malvinas Argentinas Partido of Buenos Aires Province.

External links

 Municipal website map

Populated places in Buenos Aires Province
Malvinas Argentinas Partido
Cities in Argentina